Yasuharu Imano (born 28 May 1973) is a Japanese professional golfer.

Imano was born in Gifu Prefecture. 

He currently plays on the Japan Golf Tour where he has won seven times between 1999 and 2009.

Professional wins (9)

Japan Golf Tour wins (7)

Japan Golf Tour playoff record (0–6)

Asia Golf Circuit wins (1)

Other wins (1)
2005 Hitachi 3Tours Championship

Results in major championships

CUT = missed the halfway cut
Note: Imano only played in The Open Championship.

Results in World Golf Championships

"T" = Tied

Team appearances
World Cup (representing Japan): 1998, 2005
Dynasty Cup (representing Japan): 2003
Royal Trophy (representing Asia): 2006

References

External links

Japanese male golfers
Japan Golf Tour golfers
Sportspeople from Gifu Prefecture
1973 births
Living people